The 2011 FIBA Africa Championship for Women (alternatively the FIBA African Championship) was the 20th FIBA Africa Championship for Women, played under the auspices of the Fédération Internationale de Basketball, the basketball sport governing body, and the African zone thereof. At stake was the berth allocated to Africa in the 2012 Summer Olympics basketball tournament. The tournament was held from September 23–October 2 in Mali.

Squads

Format
The 12 teams were divided into two groups (Groups A+B) for the preliminary round.
Round robin for the preliminary round; the top four teams advanced to the quarterfinals.
From there on a knockout system was used until the final.

Draw
The draw was held on 26 June 2011 in Bamako, Mali.

Preliminary round

Group A

{{Basketballbox|bg=#eee|date=|place=Stade 26 mars, Bamako|time=18:00|report=Boxscore
|teamA= |scoreA=57
|teamB= |scoreB=70
|Q1=14-25 |Q2=12-11 |Q3=10-16 |Q4=21-18
|points1=Makiese |rebounds1= three players 4 |assist1=Tebapale 5
|points2=Sissoko |rebounds2=Coulibaly |assist2= Traore, Gandega 4
|attendance = 
|referee = 
}}

Group B

Knockout stage
Championship bracket

Quarterfinals

Semifinals

Bronze medal game

Final

5–8th place bracket

Semifinals

Seventh place game

Fifth place game

9–12th place bracket

Semifinals

Eleventh place game

Ninth place game

Final standingsAngola rosterÂngela Cardoso, Astrida Vicente, Catarina Camufal, Cristina Matiquite, Felizarda Jorge, Fineza Eusébio, Luísa Tomás, Luzia Simão, Nacissela Maurício, Nadir Manuel, Ngiendula Filipe, Sónia Guadalupe, Coach: Aníbal Moreira

Senegal and Nigeria renounced the right to compete in the World Olympic Qualifying Tournament for Women.In these circumstances, FIBA has chosen Mozambique, the best team in the African Championship after Senegal and Nigeria.

Awards

 All-Tournament Team 
  Aya Traore
  Nacissela Maurício
  Mame Diodio Diouf
  Djenebou Sissoko
  Sónia Guadalupe

Statistical Leaders

Individual Tournament HighsPointsReboundsAssistsStealsBlocksMinutesIndividual Game Highs

Team Tournament HighsPoints per GameTotal PointsReboundsAssistsStealsBlocks2-point field goal percentage3-point field goal percentageFree throw percentage'''

Team Game highs

See also
2011 FIBA Africa Women's Clubs Champions Cup

References

External links
Official Website

2011
FIBA Africa Championship for Women
FIBA Africa Championship for Women
International women's basketball competitions hosted by Mali
2011 in women's basketball